Robbie Rochow (born 22 August 1990) is an Australian former professional rugby league footballer who played as a  forward in the 2010s. 

He previously played for the Melbourne Storm in two spells, the Newcastle Knights, South Sydney Rabbitohs and the Wests Tigers in the NRL. He played for New South Wales Country in 2014.

Background
Born in Maitland, New South Wales, Rochow attended All Saints College, Maitland. He played his junior football for the East Maitland Griffins before graduating to first-grade for the Kurri Kurri Bulldogs. As a 17-year-old, Rochow played SG Ball with the Newcastle Knights before being signed by the Melbourne Storm. Rochow played for Melbourne's NYC team in 2009 and 2010. In 2009, Rochow played in the Toyota Cup Grand Final-winning Melbourne team.

Playing career

2010
In Round 14, Rochow made his NRL debut for the Melbourne club against the Sydney Roosters off the interchange bench in their 38-6 loss at AAMI Park. This was Rochow’s only NRL match for the season.

2011
In July, Rochow signed a one-year contract with the Newcastle Knights, his junior club, to link up with Wayne Bennett. He only played 1 match in 2011.

2012
In May, Rochow re-signed with the Newcastle club on a two-year contract after impressive form in the NSW Cup. In Round 19, Rochow made his club debut for the Newcastle side off the interchange bench after Neville Costigan was ruled out with injury. In Round 21 against the Canberra Raiders, Rochow scored his first NRL try in the club's 36-6 win at Canberra Stadium. Rochow finished his first year with the Newcastle outfit playing in eight matches and scoring one try.

2013
On 22 May, Rochow re-signed with the Newcastle side on a two-year contract. Rochow finished the season with him playing in all 27 matches and scoring two tries.

2014
In February, Rochow was selected in Newcastle's 2014 inaugural Auckland Nines squad. Rochow was selected for the Country Origin squad for the annual City vs Country Origin match. Rochow played off the interchange bench in the 26-26 all draw in Dubbo. He finished the year with him playing in all of Newcastle's 24 matches and scoring three tries.

2015
On 31 January and 1 February, Rochow played for Newcastle in the 2015 NRL Auckland Nines. His 2015 season was interrupted by back and arm injuries, limiting his game time to just five matches and scoring one try as the club finished last.

2016
In February, Rochow co-captained the Newcastle club in the 2016 NRL Auckland Nines. 

On 26 August 2016, Rochow signed a one-year contract with the South Sydney Rabbitohs starting in 2017. He finished the 2016 season having played in eight matches in his last season for the Newcastle side.

2017
In February 2017, Rochow was named in South Sydney's 2017 NRL Auckland Nines squad. In round 1 of the 2017 NRL season, he made his club debut for South Sydney against the Wests Tigers, playing off the interchange bench in their 18-34 loss at ANZ Stadium. After failing to gain a regular spot in the South Sydney line-up, he played the majority of the first half of the season with North Sydney in the Intrust Super Premiership NSW. He made a total of four appearances for North Sydney.

In July, Rochow rejoined the Melbourne Storm, the club he started his NRL career at, for the remainder of the season, after being released from his South Sydney contract in a player swap with South Sydney for Melbourne forward Dean Britt.

In September, he signed a two-year contract with the Wests Tigers, starting in 2018.

2018
In round 1 of the 2018 NRL season, he made his debut for the Wests Tigers against the Sydney Roosters, playing at second row 10-8 win at ANZ Stadium. In round 4 against the Parramatta Eels, he scored his first try for the West Tigers 30-20 win at ANZ Stadium.

2019 Final Season
Rochow did not play a single game for the Wests Tigers in the 2019 NRL season, featuring exclusively for their reserve grade feeder club Western Suburbs. At the end of the season Rochow announced his retirement.

References

External links
Wests Tigers profile
NRL profile
South Sydney Rabbitohs profile

1990 births
Living people
Australian people of German descent
Country New South Wales Origin rugby league team players
Newcastle Knights players
Melbourne Storm players
Kurri Kurri Bulldogs players
North Sydney Bears NSW Cup players
Rugby league second-rows
Rugby league locks
Rugby league players from Maitland, New South Wales
South Sydney Rabbitohs players
Wests Tigers players
Western Suburbs Magpies NSW Cup players